Marie-Pierre Yvonne Tricot (5 February 1949 – 10 February 2013), known professionally as Marie-Pierre Castel, or Pony Tricot, was a French actress. She became notable for her collaboration with Jean Rollin, appearing in a number of his films, including, La vampire nue (1969), Le frisson des vampires (1970), Requiem pour un vampire (1971), and Lèvres de sang (1975).

Career
Castel started her career working in the beauty industry, as a barber. She is best known for appearing in films directed by Jean Rollin, often playing vampires, her most notable being Requiem for a Vampire, in which she played the lead role.  She appeared in several of Rollin's films alongside her twin sister Catherine Castel, The Nude Vampire, Lips of Blood, Phantasmes and his erotic films Bacchanales Sexuelles and Hard Penetrations.  In the films by Rollin in which Marie-Pierre appeared alone without her sister, The Shiver of the Vampires and Requiem for a Vampire, the roles in both were originally supposed to go to Catherine, but due to personal issues, Rollin offered the roles to Marie-Pierre.  She has also worked with directors Jean-Marie Pallardy, Bernard Launois, Jean Desvilles and Francis Girod.  She has also been credited as "Pony Tricot", "Pony Castel" and "Marie-Pierre Tricot". Marie-Pierre has not appeared in a film since 1977.

Filmography

Notes

References

External links 
 
Article/interview with Marie-Pierre Castel from around 1971-1973 in a French magazine

1949 births
2013 deaths
People from Villejuif
Twin actresses
French film actresses
French twins
20th-century French actresses
French pornographic film actresses